Tatyana Semyonovna Barysheva (31 December 1896 - 10 February 1979) was a Soviet stage and film actress.

Life
Barysheva was born in Moscow. From 1915 to 1918 she was an actress at the Drama Studio of the Moscow Philharmonic. Later she also worked at the Kalyaevsky People's House in Moscow, as well as with theater troupes in Vladimir and Vyatka. In 1945, she became an actress at the Moscow State Film Actor Theater, where she remained until 1957. During her film career of more than forty years, she tended to play comedic character roles. Outside of cinema, she was most active in the vaudeville scene, where her fellow actors nicknamed her "Kolobok" in reference to her rotund physique. In 1977 she moved into a film actors' nursing home in Moscow, and died there two years later.

Filmography
 1925 — Moroka (Морока) — peasant girl
 1926 — Wings of the Slave (Крылья холопа) — hay girl
 1926 — The Reckoning (Расплата) — NEP woman
 1927 — Bulat-Batır (Булат-батыр) — the genius of victory
 1928 — The Captain's Daughter (Капитанская дочка) — deaconess
 1930 — The State Official (Государственный чиновник) — nun
 1932 — The High Life (Изящная жизнь) — prostitute
 1932 — The Master of the World (Властелин мира) — sentry
 1932 — Wings (Крылья) — masseuse
 1933 — The Black Barracks (Чёрный барак) — barrack commandant's wife
 1933 — Conveyor of Death (Конвейер смерти) — bit part
 1933 — One Joy (Одна радость) — philistine
 1934 — Petersburg Night (Петербургская ночь) — provincial actress
 1934 — The Private Life of Peter Vinograd (Частная жизнь Петра Виноградова) — Senya's mother
 1935 — Ball and Heart (Мяч и сердце) - head of children's home
 1936 — Chudesnitsa (Чудесница) — milkmaid
 1936 — Paris Dawn (Зори Парижа) — bit part
 1939 — Vasilisa the Beautiful (Василиса Прекрасная) — Melanya's mother
 1939 — Sorochinskaya Fair (Сорочинская ярмарка) — Kuma
 1939 — The Foundling (Подкидыш) — dentist
 1939 — Night in September (Ночь в сентябре) — Sokolov's wife
 1941 — Four Hearts (Сердца четырёх) — Assistant professor Yershova
 1941 — The Pig and the Shepherd (Свинарка и пастух) — kolkhoz worker
 1941 — The Artamanov Case (Дело Артамоновых) — Barsky's wife
 1944 — Six P.M. (В 6 часов вечера после войны) — resident of house number 5
 1944 — Girl No. 217 (Человек № 217) — Frau Krauss
 1945 — Twins (Близнецы) — orphanage director
 1946 — Son of the Regiment (Cын полка) — doctor
 1947 — Ballad of Siberia (Сказание о земле Сибирской) — tea party guest
 1947 — New House (Новый дом) — Vishnyak's wife
 1948 — First-Grade Girl (Первоклассница) — Marisya's grandmother
 1949 — The Train Goes East (Поезд идёт на восток) — Claudia Semyonova
 1949 — Konstantin Zaslonov (Константин Заслонов) — woman
 1950 — Generous Summer (Щедрое лето) — Antonovich's wife
 1950 — Zhukovsky (Жуковский) — Arina
 1955 — Blue Bird (Синяя птичка) — aunt Nyusya
 1955 — The White Poodle (Белый пудель) — nanny
 1956 — A Child was Born (Человек родился) — nurse
 1963 — Kingdom of Crooked Mirrors (Королевство Кривых Зеркал) — Grandmother Oli
 1964 — Jack Frost (Морозко) — matchmaker
 1964 — Welcome, or No Trespassing (Добро пожаловать, или Посторонним вход воспрещён) — cook
 1968 — Fire, Water, and Brass Pipes (Огонь, вода и… медные трубы) — nurse

References

External links
 

1896 births
1979 deaths
Soviet film actresses
Actresses from Moscow
Soviet voice actresses
Soviet stage actresses